Torsak Sa-ardeiem (born August 23, 1997) is a Thai professional footballer who plays as a centre back or right back  for Thai League 1 club Chiangmai United.

Honour
 Lamphun Warrior
 Thai League 3 (1): 2020-2021

References

External links

bangkokglassfc.com

1997 births
Living people
Torsak Sa-ardeiem
Torsak Sa-ardeiem
Torsak Sa-ardeiem
Association football defenders
Torsak Sa-ardeiem
Torsak Sa-ardeiem
Torsak Sa-ardeiem